Johann Wilhelm Buck (12 November 1869 in Bautzen, Kingdom of Saxony – 2 December 1945 in Radebeul) was a German politician and representative of the Social Democratic Party and the splinter party, Old Social Democratic Party of Germany. From 5 May 1920 to 21 March 1923, he was minister-president of the Free State of Saxony.

See also
List of Social Democratic Party of Germany politicians

References

1869 births
1945 deaths
People from Bautzen
People from the Kingdom of Saxony
Social Democratic Party of Germany politicians
Old Social Democratic Party of Germany politicians
Members of the 13th Reichstag of the German Empire
Members of the Weimar National Assembly
Members of the Reichstag of the Weimar Republic
Ministers-President of Saxony